Mike Perrino (born March 2, 1964) is a former American football tackle. He played for the Philadelphia Eagles in 1987.

References

External links

1964 births
Living people
Players of American football from Chicago
American football tackles
Notre Dame Fighting Irish football players
Philadelphia Eagles players